Tibabuyes or Juan Amarillo Wetland is a wetland, part of the Wetlands of Bogotá, located in the localities  Suba and Engativá, Bogotá, Colombia.

With the planned construction of Avenida Longitudinal de Occidente/Cundinamarca Highway, there will have to be built an overpass, which will affect the wetlands. The indigenous community and the inhabitants of the neighbourhoods surrounding the place are opposed to it.

Etymology 
The name Tibabuyes comes from Muysccubun, the language of the indigenous Muisca, who inhabited the Bogotá savanna before the Spanish conquest, and means "land of the farmers".

Flora and fauna

Birds 
Tibabuyes hosts 22 bird species.

See also 

Biodiversity of Colombia, Bogotá savanna, Thomas van der Hammen Natural Reserve
Wetlands of Bogotá

References

Bibliography

Further reading

External links 
  Fundación Humedales de Bogotá
  Conozca los 15 humedales de Bogotá - El Tiempo
  Configuración del paisaje: conflicto ambiental y proceso de urbanización en el Humedal Tibabuyes 1960-2010

Wetlands of Bogotá
Muysccubun